This is a list of Spain's 17 autonomous communities and the 2 autonomous cities of Ceuta and Melilla by their Human Development Index as of 2023 with data for the year 2021.

See also
 List of countries by Human Development Index

References 

Human Development Index
Spain
Spain